Crown Prince Sado (Hangul: 사도세자, Hanja: 思悼 世子; 13 February 1735 – 12 July 1762), personal name Yi Seon (Hangul: 이선, Hanja: 李愃), was the second son of King Yeongjo of Joseon. His biological mother was Royal Noble Consort Yeong of the Jeonui Yi clan. Due to the prior death of Sado's older half-brother, Crown Prince Hyojang, the new prince was the probable future monarch. However, at the age of 27, he died, most likely of dehydration and possibly of starvation after being confined in a rice chest on the orders of his father in the heat of summer.

Biography

Life

Lady Hyegyeong, Sado's wife, wrote a memoir in 1805 detailing their life together. She records that the prince suffered a severe illness in 1745, during which he often lost consciousness. Although he recovered, the tense relationship between Sado and King Yeongjo led to him experiencing severe anxiety whenever in his father's presence. When Sado came of age at 15, his father appointed him regent, giving him the power to make decisions on administrative matters. Yeongjo wanted Sado to have an experience of ruling the country. At the same time, Yeongjo wanted stronger power. During Sado's regency, dispute between Soron and Noron became stronger, much to Yeongjo's disappointment. Lady Hyegyeong describes King Yeongjo as perpetually dissatisfied with whichever course of action Sado chose. Yeongjo also did not permit Sado to visit the ancestral tombs until as late as 1756, nor was he allowed to attend auspicious court events. Yeongjo also always made sure to chastise his son in front of a large crowd, either of ladies-in-waiting or eunuchs. As a result, Sado formed a strong bond with his sister Princess Hwahyeop, who was similarly disfavoured by their father. When she died in 1752, Sado was reported to have grieved intensely.

In 1752, Sado read a Taoist text called Okchugyeong (옥추경, 玉樞經). Whilst reading, he hallucinated that he saw the Thunder God. Henceforth, he was terrified of thunder and refused to touch any object engraved with the characters of the book.

Sado took a secondary consort, Yang-je (Royal Noble Consort Suk), with whom he had a son in 1754. Terrified of his father's anger, Sado forced her to take abortive medicines, but still, the child was born safely. Arrangements for the delivery and housing were made by Lady Hyegyeong.

Illness
In 1757, King Yeongjo's adoptive mother (Queen Inwon) and wife (Queen Jeongseong) died within a month of each other. Sado had been close to both of them and their deaths led to a marked deterioration in his mental health and relationship with his father. As a way of dealing with his frustration and rage, Sado beat his eunuchs. In the same month as the burial of Queen Jeongseong, Sado walked into his chambers holding the severed head of a eunuch whom he had killed, forcing the ladies-in-waiting and his wife to view it. After this, he frequently killed palace staff to release his emotions, as well as assaulting and raping many ladies-in-waiting. Lady Hyegyeong reported Sado's issues to his mother Royal Noble Consort Yeong, but begged her not to speak to anyone about the matter, as she feared for her safety if Sado discovered she had told someone. By 1758, a previous phobia of Sado's regarding clothing (vestiphobia) became intensely problematic.

Late in 1757, Sado took another secondary consort, Park Bing-ae (Royal Noble Consort Gyeong), who had been a lady-in-waiting to his grandmother, so his relations with her were considered to breach the incest taboo. When Yeongjo found out, he berated his son and Sado eventually jumped down a well to attempt drowning himself, but a guard pulled him out. Lady Hyegyeong had, by this point, managed to have Bing-ae hidden in the home of Sado's sister, Princess Hwawan.

On his birthday in 1760, Sado suffered a burst of outrage at his parents, berating his mother Lady Yeong-bin, as well his own son, and two daughters. After this, he demanded that Princess Hwawan, use her influence over King Yeongjo to move palaces and allow Sado to visit the springs at Onyang. He also threatened to "slash Princess Hwawan with [his] sword", an event witnessed by Lady Hyegyeong and Lady Yeong-bin. While Lady Hyegyeong said he was not violent to her she also noted he would beat any women who resisted his sexual overtures until he "rent their flesh" and they gave in. There was one documented incident where Sado was physically violent toward his wife, in which he threw a go board at her face and made it necessary for Lady Hyegyeong to avoid court events to hide the bruises.

In 1761 Sado beat his secondary consort Bing-ae, who had birthed several of his children, in a fit of rage while getting dressed. He left her on the floor, where she died of her injuries. Lady Hyegyeong prepared her body for the funeral rites, but, on his return, Sado reportedly said nothing about Bing-ae's death.

Execution
In the summer of 1762, an altercation with an official at court enraged Sado. In revenge, he threatened to kill the official's son, and attempted to sneak through a water passage to the upper palace. He failed to find the son and, instead, confiscated clothing and items belonging to him. Rumours that Sado had attempted to enter the upper palace to kill King Yeongjo spread around the court. Fearing for the safety of her grandchildren, Royal Consort Yeong begged Yeongjo to deal with Sado. By court rules, the body of a royal could not be defiled and, under the then-common practice of communal punishment, Sado's wife and son (the family's only direct male heir) could also face death or banishment if he were executed as a criminal. As a solution, Yeongjo ordered Sado to climb into a wooden rice chest (roughly 1.3m square / 4 feet square) on a hot July day in 1762. According to Lady Hyegyeong's memoirs, Sado begged for his life before getting into the chest, though he attempted to get out again.

Along with her children, Lady Hyegyeong was taken back to her father's house on the same day. After two days, King Yeongjo had the chest containing Sado tied with rope, covered with grass, and moved to the upper palace. Sado responded from inside the chest until the night of the seventh day; the chest was opened and he was pronounced dead on the eighth day. Yeongjo then restored him to the position of crown prince and gave him the posthumous title Sado, meaning "thinking of with great sorrow".

Conspiracy theory
During the 19th century, there were rumors that Prince Sado had not been mentally ill, but had been framed; however, these rumors are contradicted by his wife, Lady Hyegyeong, in The Memoirs of Lady Hyegyeong. Sado's death remains an issue of debate as to whether his death was retribution for his actual misconduct or if he was the victim of a conspiracy by his political opponents.

Burial
Crown Prince Sado was buried on Mt. BaebongSan in Yangju. His body was moved by his son, King Jeongjo, to its current location in 1789, then called Hyeonnyungwon near Suwon, 30 kilometers south of Seoul. Five years later the Hwaseong Fortress was built by King Jeongjo, specifically to memorialize and honor his father's tomb (the construction lasted 1794-1796, while the official reception was 1795). Lady Hyegyeong died and was buried with her husband in 1816.

Prince Sado and Lady Hyegyeong were posthumously elevated in status and given the titles Emperor Yangjo and Empress Heonyeong in 1899 during the reign of Emperor Gwangmu (Gojong). Their tomb and the adjacent tomb of their son, King Jeongjo, and his wife, Queen Hyoui, were upgraded accordingly and renamed Yungneung.

Taboo and reinstatement
Prince Sado was reinstated fifteen days after he died but King Yeongjo banned any mention of the prince's name for the rest of his reign. Because of this decision, Prince Sado's son, Jeongjo, who ascended the throne following the passing of King Yeongjo, as the heir to his deceased half-uncle (Crown Prince Hyojang) instead. One of Jeongjo's first statements upon becoming king, however, was to declare, "I am the son of Prince Sado." Jeongjo always showed great filial devotion to his father, Crown Prince Sado, and he changed the posthumous name of his father's to a longer one, which is the origin of the latter's alternative title, Crown Prince Jangheon.

Family
Father: King Yeongjo of Joseon (조선 영조) (31 October 1694 – 22 April 1776)
Grandfather: King Sukjong of Joseon (조선 숙종) (7 October 1661 – 12 July 1720)
Biological grandmother: Royal Noble Consort Suk of the Haeju Choe clan (숙빈 최씨) (17 December 1670 – 9 April 1718)
Adoptive grandmother: Queen Inwon the Gyeongju Kim clan (인원왕후 김씨) (3 November 1687 – 13 May 1757)
Biological mother: Royal Noble Consort Yeong of the Jeonui Yi clan (영빈 이씨) (15 August 1696 – 23 August 1764)
Grandfather: Yi Yu-beon (이유번)
Grandmother: Lady Kim of the Hanyang Kim clan (한양 김씨)
 Adoptive mother: Queen Jeongseong of the Daegu Seo clan (정성왕후 서씨) (12 January 1693 – 3 April 1757) 

Consorts and their Respective Issue(s):
 Queen Heongyeong of the Pungsan Hong clan (헌경왕후 홍씨) (6 August 1735 – 13 January 1816)
 Yi Jeong, Crown Prince Uiso (의소세자 이정) (27 September 1750 – 17 April 1752), first son
 Grand Heir Yi San (28 October 1752 – 18 August 1800) (왕세손 이산), second son
 Royal Princess Cheongyeon (1754 – 9 June 1821) (청연공주), first daughter
 Royal Princess Cheongseon (1756 – 20 July 1802) (청선공주), second daughter
 Royal Noble Consort Suk of the Buan Im clan (? – 1773) (숙빈 임씨)
 Yi In, Prince Euneon (은언군 이인) (1 February 1754 – 30 June 1801), third son
Yi Jin, Prince Eunsin (은신군 이진) (1755 – 1771), fourth son
 Royal Noble Consort Gyeong of the Park clan (경빈 박씨) (? – 1761)
 Princess Cheonggeun (청근옹주) (1758 – 1835), third daughter
 Yi Chan, Prince Eunjeon (은전군 이찬) (14 August 1759 – 26 August 1778), fifth son
 Court Lady Yi (수칙 이씨, 守則 李氏)
 Ga-seon (가선, 假仙)

In popular culture
Portrayed by Hwang Hae-nam in the 1956 film The Tragic Prince.
Portrayed by Do Kum-bo in the 1963 film Mangbuseok (A Wife Turned to Stone).
Portrayed by Jeong Bo-seok in the 1988 TV series O, Heaven.
Portrayed by Choi Soo-jong in the 1988 MBC TV series 500 Years of Joseon: The Memoirs of Lady Hyegyeong.
Portrayed by Im Ho in the 1998 MBC TV series The Great King's Road.
Portrayed by Lee Chang-hoon in the 2007 MBC TV series Lee San, Wind of the Palace.
Portrayed by Jo Han-jun in the 2007 CGV TV series Eight Days, Assassination Attempts against King Jeongjo.
Portrayed by ?? in the 2008 KBS2 TV series The Great King, Sejong.
Portrayed by Oh Man-seok in the 2011 SBS TV series Warrior Baek Dong-soo.
Portrayed by Lee Je-hoon in the 2014 SBS TV series Secret Door.
Portrayed by Yoo Ah-in in the 2015 film The Throne.
Portrayed by Do Sang-woo in the 2021 MBC TV series The Red Sleeve.
Portrayed in a fictitious manner in the webcomic "Vampire of the East" by Joohee Jo and Seunghee Han published by NETCOMICS

Ancestry

References

Notes

Works cited

External links
 Biography of Crown Prince Sado of Korea

1735 births
1762 deaths
18th-century Korean people
Executed royalty
Executed serial killers
Heirs apparent who never acceded
House of Yi
Male serial killers
People executed by starvation
Korean murderers
Korean princes
Korean rapists
Korean serial killers
People from Seoul